The 2017–18 Federation of Bosnia and Herzegovina Cup was the qualifying competition for the 2017–18 Bosnia and Herzegovina Football Cup.

Format
32 teams took part in two rounds of the competition with 12 Second round winners qualifying for the national competition.

Participating teams
16 First League of the Federation of Bosnia and Herzegovina teams were joined by 16 lower league teams (third level and lower).

Six cantons with the most teams competing in the cup had two teams each in the competition while remaining the four cantos had one team each. Each canton organized its own cup tournament which acted as the FBiH Cup qualifying stage. If there were not enough teams interested in taking part in canton cup, no cup was organized and the canton FA chose one team to represent them in the FBiH Cup. 

Roman number in brackets denote the level of respective league in Bosnian football league system in 2017-18 season

Calendar

First round
Played on 23 August 2017

Second round
Played on 6 September 2017

External links
Football Federation of the Federation of Bosnia and Herzegovina

2017–18 in Bosnia and Herzegovina football